Juan Carlos Pérez is a Dominican professional baseball outfielder for the Charleston Dirty Birds of the Atlantic League of Professional Baseball. He has played in Major League Baseball (MLB) for the San Francisco Giants and won the world series with the club in 2014.

Career
Pérez attended DeWitt Clinton High School in New York City, and after not being selected in the Major League Baseball draft, he attended Western Oklahoma State College.

San Francisco Giants
The Giants drafted Pérez in the 13th round of the 2008 MLB draft. The Giants added Pérez to their 40-man roster after the 2012 season. He made his MLB debut for the Giants on June 9, 2013 at a game against the Arizona Diamondbacks.

Pérez played in six games and received 14 at-bats during the 2014 World Series. He was chosen to start Game 7 in left field over newly-converted first baseman Travis Ishikawa, due to his superior defense. In that game, Pérez made an impressive running catch near the foul line in the fifth inning to rob Norichika Aoki of a double. The catch preserved a 3–2 lead, and Giants eventually won the game and the World Series.

In 2015, Pérez played in 22 games, slashing .282/.300/.359 with no home runs and 2 RBI. On November 6, 2015, he was outrighted off of the 40-man roster and became a free agent.

After the 2015 season, he was selected to the roster for the Dominican Republic national baseball team at the 2015 WBSC Premier12.

Chicago Cubs
On December 21, 2015, Pérez signed a minor league contract with the Chicago Cubs. He spent 2016 with the Iowa Cubs, where he batted .276 with 9 home runs and 57 RBIs.

Detroit Tigers
On December 14, 2016, Pérez signed a minor league contract with the Detroit Tigers that included an invitation to spring training. He was released on August 8, 2017.

Acereros de Monclova
On April 23, 2018, Pérez signed with the Acereros de Monclova of the Mexican Baseball League. He was released on May 4, 2018. Pérez re-signed with the team on July 27, 2018.

Rieleros de Aguascalientes
On July 16, 2019, Pérez was traded to the Rieleros de Aguascalientes of the Mexican League. He was released on January 24, 2020.

After the 2020 season, he played for Águilas Cibaeñas of the Dominican Professional Baseball League(LIDOM). He has also played for Dominican Republic in the 2021 Caribbean Series.

Olmecas de Tabasco
On April 20, 2021, Pérez signed with the High Point Rockers of the Atlantic League of Professional Baseball. However, prior to the ALPB season on May 15, his contract was purchased by the Olmecas de Tabasco of the Mexican League. In 62 games, Pérez slashed .292/.371/.388 with 1 home run and 27 RBIs. He was released following the season on October 20, 2021.

Charleston Dirty Birds
On April 12, 2022, Pérez signed with the Charleston Dirty Birds of the Atlantic League of Professional Baseball.

References

External links

 

1986 births
Living people
Acereros de Monclova players
Águilas Cibaeñas players
Augusta GreenJackets players
DeWitt Clinton High School alumni
Dominican Republic expatriate baseball players in Mexico
Dominican Republic expatriate baseball players in the United States
Dominican Republic national baseball team players
Fresno Grizzlies players
Iowa Cubs players
Major League Baseball outfielders
Major League Baseball players from the Dominican Republic
Mexican League baseball center fielders
Mexican League baseball right fielders
Olmecas de Tabasco players
People from Santiago de los Caballeros
Richmond Flying Squirrels players
Rieleros de Aguascalientes players
Sacramento River Cats players
San Francisco Giants players
San Jose Giants players
Toledo Mud Hens players
Western Oklahoma State Pioneers baseball players
2015 WBSC Premier12 players